This is a list of the named geological faults affecting the rocks of Northern Ireland.

Terminology
See the main article on faults for a fuller treatment of fault types and nomenclature but in brief, the main types are normal faults, reverse faults, thrusts or thrust faults and strike-slip faults.

Key to table
Column 1 indicates the name of the fault. Note that different authors may deploy different names for one and the same feature, or a part of a feature. Conversely the same name may be applied to two different features, particularly in the case of smaller faults with a wide geographic separation.
Column 2 indicates the county in which the fault occurs. Some traverse two or more counties of course.
Column 3 indicates the Irish grid reference for the approximate midpoint of the fault (as mapped). Note that the mapped extent of a fault may not correspond to its actual extent.
Column 4 indicates on which sheet of the Geological Survey of Northern Ireland's 1:50,000 scale geological map series of Northern Ireland, the fault is shown and named (either on map/s or cross-section/s or both). Some of the faults are also depicted on the 1:250,000 scale geological map of Northern Ireland.
Column 5 indicates a selection of publications in which references to the fault may be found. See references section for full details of publication.

Tabulated list of faults

References
 Map sheet 44 (and accompanying memoir) of the series of 1:50,000 scale geological maps of Northern Ireland published by Geological Survey of Northern Ireland. 
 Lyle, P. 2003 Classic geology in Europe 5 The north of Ireland Terra Publishing, Harpenden

See also
 List of geological faults of England 
 List of geological faults of Scotland
 List of geological faults of Wales 
 List of geological folds in Great Britain 
 Geological structure of Great Britain

Geology of Northern Ireland
Structural geology
Northern Ireland
Geological faults of Northern Ireland
Geological faults of Northern Ireland